Freda Mary Cook (9 November 1896–20 January 1990) was a New Zealand community worker, socialist, feminist, peace activist, social reformer and teacher. She was born in Alvescot, Oxfordshire, England on 9 November 1896.

References

1896 births
1990 deaths
New Zealand educators
New Zealand feminists
New Zealand social workers
New Zealand activists
New Zealand women activists
New Zealand socialists
New Zealand socialist feminists
English emigrants to New Zealand
People from Oxfordshire (before 1974)